Thalamoporellidae is a family of bryozoans belonging to the order Cheilostomatida.

Genera:
 Dibunostoma Cheetham, 1963
 Diploporella MacGillivray, 1885
 Hesychoxenia Gordon & Parker, 1991
 Marsupioporella Soule, Soule & Chaney, 1991
 Thairopora MacGillivray, 1882
 Thalamoporella Hincks, 1887

References

Cheilostomatida